Stewart Television was an American game show production company formed by Bob Stewart in 1964 originally based in New York City.

History

Stewart found a job and started creating game shows for Goodson-Todman Productions in 1956.  One of the first game shows he created was The Price is Right aired on NBC and was hosted by Bill Cullen.  The second game show Stewart created was To Tell the Truth the same year.  The third was Password in 1961.  In 1964, Stewart left Goodson-Todman and formed his production company Bob Stewart Productions.

His first production for his independent company was the game show Eye Guess that aired in 1966 and was co-produced by Filmways and lasted until 1969.  It was followed by the game Personality that ran from 1967 to 1969.   In 1973, he created the successful Pyramid game show series starting with The $10,000 Pyramid with his son Sande Stewart who joined his father the same year and produced the series and also formed another production company Basada, Inc. on 23 February, which was named after his sons: Barry, Sande, and David Stewart. As years went by, the series changed its name from The $10,000 Pyramid all the way to The $100,000 Pyramid.

New Location

In 1978, Bob Stewart Productions was relocated to Los Angeles, California, with its first syndicated program at its new location, The Love Experts.  Programs already on air in the meantime were still taped in New York, mainly The $20,000 Pyramid and Pass the Buck.  In 1982, Stewart revived The $25,000 Pyramid, but to keep the name and the game show confused with Cullen's version, the format was renamed as The New $25,000 Pyramid with Dick Clark as host.  The show was taped at CBS Television City in Hollywood, California.  The same year, Bob and his son Sande created the unsold game show Twisters.  It would be the first game show credited by Bob Stewart & Sande Stewart Productions (which would officially exist starting in 1987).  Another game show was Go, that was based on the bonus round of Chain Reaction produced alongside his son, Sande one year later. In 1979, Bob Stewart had signed a deal with Metromedia Producers Corporation to launch new projects.

In 1985, Bob Stewart formed another production company called Bob Stewart Cable, Inc. for game show programs produced for cable.  There were only two game shows produced under this banner, which were taped in two Canadian cities and produced for the USA Network.  The first was Jackpot!, a revival of Stewart's 1974 series, which was taped in Toronto.  The other was The New Chain Reaction, a revival of Stewart's short-lived 1980 series, which was taped in Montreal.  By 1987, Bob Stewart was semi-retired, and his son Sande took over operations. In 1990, the company was renamed again as Stewart Television, while the cable production company was likewise renamed Stewart Cable TV, Inc..

A short time later, Sande Stewart formed Stewart Tele Enterprises and produced the revived The $100,000 Pyramid in 1991, which was hosted by John Davidson and was canceled in 1992 after its second season, the same year Bob Stewart fully retired.

Sony

In 1994, Bob Stewart sold his company to Sony Corporation.  Sande, in the meantime, went ahead and created and produced more game shows with his own independent company Sande Stewart Television.  A majority of Bob Stewart's game shows Sony owns has been aired on GSN.  Two of Bob Stewart's game show formats have been revived into new incarnations.  They were Pyramid and was hosted by Donny Osmond in 2002 for syndication and Chain Reaction in 2006 produced by British television producer Michael Davies' production company Embassy Row in association with and distributed by Sony Pictures Television aired on GSN and was hosted by Dylan Lane.  Ironically, Embassy Row would be acquired by Sony Pictures on 14 January 2009.

Today, Stewart Television is an active in-name-only unit of Sony Pictures Television.

Employees

Recently said was Bob Stewart's son Sande Stewart, who joined the company in 1973.

The most prolific announcers for Stewart were Don Pardo and Bob Clayton. Pardo was an announcer on most of the Stewart productions that originated from New York for NBC (examples are Eye Guess, Three on a Match, Winning Streak, and many others). Clayton was an alternative for Pardo, as he was the first announcer for Pyramid, and also announced for Blankety Blanks, Pass the Buck, and Shoot for the Stars.

Another longtime employee for Stewart Tele Enterprises was Jeopardy! game show announcer Johnny Gilbert, who would serve his announcement duties on the 1980 incarnation of Chain Reaction, The (New) $25,000 Pyramid, Double Talk, and both 1985 and 1991 incarnations of The $100,000 Pyramid.  He was also an announcer at Barry & Enright Productions and Merv Griffin Enterprises.  Charlie O'Donnell, Dean Goss, and Bob Hilton were also fill-ins for Pyramid eventually.  The above mentions were also employees for Stewart.

Former Wheel of Fortune announcer Jack Clark also served his duties on The $10,000 Pyramid and The New $25,000 Pyramid until 1985.  He was also an announcer for the short-lived game show/talk show The Love Experts, Eye Guess, The Face Is Familiar and the unsold game show pilot The Riddlers. He had also hosted pilots for Stewart, which failed to sell.

Dick Clark was another longtime employee, having hosted all except one Pyramid incarnation from 1973 to 1988.  One of the other longtime employees was a close friend to Bob Stewart; Bill Cullen, who has hosted the syndicated version of The $25,000 Pyramid among other series: Pass the Buck, Blankety Blanks, Winning Streak, Eye Guess, Three on a Match, The Love Experts, and the 1980 version of Chain Reaction.

Ann Marie Schmitt was the producer of most of the Bob Stewart series.  Another member of the production staff was Erin Perry, who is the daughter of game show host Jim Perry.  Francine Bergman and David Michaels were associate producers of most of Bob Stewart's 1980s game shows.  Directors included Mike Gargiulo and Bruce Burmester.

Library

Sony Pictures Entertainment owns almost the entire Bob Stewart Productions library. However, there are exceptions of three Pyramid incarnations which SPE does not own.

First, the original 1974-1979 nighttime run series of The $25,000 Pyramid starring Bill Cullen, was originally distributed by Viacom Enterprises and is currently distributed by CBS Television Distribution.

Secondly, the short-lived 1981 syndicated prime-time run series of The $50,000 Pyramid with Dick Clark was distributed by CPM Incorporated, a division of Colgate-Palmolive. Currently, there is no status on who owns that incarnation.

Finally, the 1991 syndicated series of The $100,000 Pyramid, hosted by John Davidson was distributed by Orbis Communications and produced in association with Carolco Television in its first season, and distributed by Multimedia Entertainment in its second season.  This incarnation is held by Universal Television and distributed by NBCUniversal Television Distribution. 
 
However, Sony Pictures Television owns the formatting rights.

CBS Television Distribution (which is the successor of Viacom Enterprises) also has distribution rights to The Love Experts, hosted by Bill Cullen.

Unfortunately, many of the pre-1978 game show master tapes have been destroyed and completely wiped due to network practices.  Others have fallen into the public domain and others through the game show trading circuit.

Created by Bob Stewart for Goodson-Todman

These are the titles created by Stewart for Goodson-Todman that are now owned by Fremantle.

The Price is Right:  (1956–1965) (Stewart producer)
To Tell the Truth: (1956–1968) (Stewart exec. producer 1956-1965)
Password: (1961–1967) (Stewart exec. producer 1961-1965)

Created by Bob Stewart for Stewart Television

These are the titles created by Stewart for his company that are now owned by Sony Pictures Television.

Eye Guess: (1966–1969) (co-produced by Filmways)
The Face Is Familiar: (1966) (co-produced by Filmways)
Personality: (1967–1969) (co-produced by Filmways)
You're Putting Me On: (1969) (co-produced by Filmways)
Three on a Match: (1971–1974)
Pyramid (From the original The $10,000 Pyramid to Clark's The $100,000 Pyramid, excepting The $50,000 Pyramid, the Cullen-hosted The $25,000 Pyramid, and the Davidson-hosted The $100,000 Pyramid): (1973–1980 and 1982–1988)
Jackpot!: (1974–1975, co-produced by Global Television and USA Network 1985-1988, and co-produced by Sande Stewart and Reeves Entertainment Group 1989-1990)
Winning Streak: (1974–1975)
Blankety Blanks: (1975)
Shoot for the Stars: (1977) (a.k.a. Shoot the Works)
Pass the Buck: (1978)
Chain Reaction: (1980) The New Chain Reaction (co-produced by Champlain Productions and USA Network 1986, co-produced by Sande Stewart with Champlain Productions and USA Network 1987-1991)
Go: (1983–1984) (co-produced by Sande Stewart)
Double Talk: (1986) (A revival of Shoot for the Stars)

Unsold pilots
Celebrity Doubletalk: (1967) (co-produced by Filmways)
Second Guessers: (1969)
Says Who?: (1971)
Monday Night Quarterback: (1971)
The $10,000 Sweep: (1972)
Caught in the Act: (1975)
The Finish Line: (1975)
Get Rich Quick: (1977)
The Riddlers: (1978)
Mind Readers: (1978) (Hosted by Geoff Edwards, and unrelated to the Goodson-Todman show of the same name)
Caught in the Act: (1979)
Punch Lines: (1979)
Strictly Confidential: (1980)
Twisters: (1982) (co-produced by Sande Stewart)
Famous Last Words: (1983)
Jackpot: (1984) (Hosted by Nipsey Russell)
$50,000 a Minute: (1985)
Money in the Blank: (1987)
Eye Q: (1988)
The Finish Line: (1990)

Titles with distribution rights held by CBS Television Distribution
The $25,000 Pyramid (1974–1979 evening version hosted by Bill Cullen)
The Love Experts: (1978–1979)

Titles with distribution rights held by NBCUniversal Television Distribution
The $100,000 Pyramid: (1991 syndicated nighttime run series starring John Davidson) (distribution rights only)

Other properties
The $50,000 Pyramid: (1981 syndicated series hosted by Dick Clark) (distributed by CPM, Inc.)

Past company names

Bob Stewart Productions (original name of the production company)
Bob Stewart & Sande Stewart Productions (1982–1984 and 1987–1991)
Bob Stewart Cable (for cable broadcast productions), renamed as Stewart Cable TV, Inc. in 1990
Basada, Inc. (was used as the copyright production for the Pyramid incarnations, Go, Double Talk, and the Money in the Blank unsold pilot)

References

External links
Official website of Stewart Television, Inc.

Sony Pictures Television
Television production companies of the United States
Mass media companies established in 1964